Arthur Asa Berger (born 1933) is Professor Emeritus in Broadcast and Electronic Communication Arts at San Francisco State University.

Early life and education
He received a "Catholic" education in his public high school despite the fact that he is Jewish. Most of his teachers were Catholics who were educated at Boston College or College of the Holy Cross. He gradually developed interest in writing and drawing.
He got a B.A. in literature and philosophy at the University of Massachusetts in 1954, assuming that a good education would fit him for any job. Then he applied to graduate school in journalism, thinking that he liked to write and might find journalism an interesting career. He was accepted into the University of California Berkeley journalism school and started there in the summer of 1954 but transferred to the University of Iowa where he could work with people like Marguerite Young. He was also able to take a couple of philosophy courses with Gustav Bergmann from the Vienna Circle. He was drafted in the summer of 1956, eleven days after he received his MA. He got out of the Army in 1958 and went to Europe for a year.

Academic career

A year after he came back from Europe, he enrolled at the University of Minnesota's program for a PhD in American Studies. In time, he ended up teaching in the Broadcast and Electronic Communication Arts department at San Francisco State University where he taught courses on writing and media criticism. Berger has published more than 130 articles and more than 70 books in the course of his career.  He spent 1963-64 as a Fulbright scholar at the University of Milan and has also taught at Jinan University and Tsing Hua university in China, spent a month as a Fulbright Senior Specialist lecturing on semiotics in Argentina and lectured in more than a dozen universities in various countries. His works have been cited thousands of times by international academics.

Personal life
Berger is married to Phyllis Berger and they have two children. Their son Gabriel went to Harvard for his BA and has a Ph.D. in
mathematics from Columbia.  He works for Google now.  Their daughter Nina has a doctorate from an institute that trains psychoanalysts and is a psychoanalyst. Jason Berger was his brother. He manages his personal weblog named Decoder Man.

Selected bibliography

(1982). Media analysis techniques. Beverly Hills: Sage Publications.
(1984). Signs in contemporary culture: An introduction to semiotics. New York: Longman.
(1989). Seeing is believing: An introduction to visual communication. Mountain View, Calif: Mayfield Pub. Co.
(1997). Bloom's morning: Coffee, comforters, and the secret meaning of everyday life. Boulder, Colo: Westview Press.
(1997)  Postmortem for a Postmodernist. Walnut Creek, California: AltaMira Press
(1998). Media research techniques. Thousand Oaks: Sage Publications.
(2003). Durkheim is dead!: Sherlock Holmes is introduced to sociological theory. Walnut Creek, CA: Altamira Press/Rowman & Littlefield Publishers.
(2011). Ads, Fads, and Consumer Culture: Advertising's Impact on American Character and Society. Boulder, Colo: Rowman & Littlefi eld Publishers, Inc.
(2017). The Art of Comedy Writing. Routledge.

References

Communication scholars
1933 births
Living people
Date of birth missing (living people)
Place of birth missing (living people)
American media critics
Mass media theorists
North American cultural studies
Philosophers of language
Rationalists
Television studies
San Francisco State University faculty
Jewish American social scientists
Jewish American writers
American male essayists
Screenwriting instructors
Philosophers from California
Writers from San Francisco
21st-century American male writers
21st-century American essayists